

Events

Pre-1600
 437 – Emperor Valentinian III begins his reign over the Western Roman Empire. His mother Galla Placidia ends her regency, but continues to exercise political influence at the court in Rome.
 626 – Li Shimin, the future Emperor Taizong of Tang, ambushes and kills his rival brothers Li Yuanji and Li Jiancheng in the Xuanwu Gate Incident.
 706 – In China, Emperor Zhongzong of Tang inters the bodies of relatives in the Qianling Mausoleum, located on Mount Liang outside Chang'an.
 866 – Battle of Brissarthe: The Franks led by Robert the Strong are defeated by a joint Breton-Viking army.
 936 – King Henry the Fowler dies in his royal palace in Memleben. He is succeeded by his son Otto I, who becomes the ruler of East Francia.
 963 – The Byzantine army proclaims Nikephoros II Phokas Emperor of the Romans on the plains outside Cappadocian Caesarea.
1298 – The Battle of Göllheim is fought between Albert I of Habsburg and Adolf of Nassau-Weilburg.
1494 – The Treaty of Tordesillas is ratified by Spain.
1504 – Bogdan III the One-Eyed becomes Voivode of Moldavia.
1555 – Ottoman Admiral Turgut Reis sacks the Italian city of Paola.
1561 – Menas, emperor of Ethiopia, defeats a revolt in Emfraz.
1582 – Battle of Yamazaki: Toyotomi Hideyoshi defeats Akechi Mitsuhide.

1601–1900
1613 – The first English expedition (from Virginia) against Acadia led by Samuel Argall takes place.
1644 – English Civil War: Battle of Marston Moor.
1645 – Battle of Alford: Wars of the Three Kingdoms.
1698 – Thomas Savery patents the first steam engine.
1776 – American Revolution: The Continental Congress adopts a resolution severing ties with the Kingdom of Great Britain although the wording of the formal Declaration of Independence is not adopted until July 4.
1816 – The  strikes the Bank of Arguin and 151 people on board have to be evacuated on an improvised raft, a case immortalised by Géricault's painting The Raft of the Medusa.
1822 – Thirty-five slaves, including Denmark Vesey, are hanged in South Carolina after being accused of organizing a slave rebellion.
1823 – Bahia Independence Day: The end of Portuguese rule in Brazil, with the final defeat of the Portuguese crown loyalists in the province of Bahia.
1839 – Twenty miles off the coast of Cuba, 53 kidnapped Africans led by Joseph Cinqué mutiny and take over the slave ship Amistad.
1840 – A  7.4 earthquake strikes present-day Turkey and Armenia; combined with the effects of an eruption on Mount Ararat, kills 10,000 people.
1853 – The Russian Army crosses the Prut river into the Danubian Principalities (Moldavia and Wallachia), providing the spark that will set off the Crimean War.
1864 – Dimitri Atanasescu founds the first Romanian school in the Balkans for the Aromanians in Trnovo, in the Ottoman Empire (now in North Macedonia).
1871 – Victor Emmanuel II of Italy enters Rome after having conquered it from the Papal States.
1881 – Charles J. Guiteau shoots and fatally wounds U.S. President James A. Garfield (who will die of complications from his wounds on September 19).
1890 – The U.S. Congress passes the Sherman Antitrust Act.
1897 – British-Italian engineer Guglielmo Marconi obtains a patent for radio in London.
1900 – An airship designed and constructed by Count Ferdinand von Zeppelin of Germany made its first flight on Lake Constance near Friedrichshafen.
  1900   – Jean Sibelius' Finlandia receives its première performance in Helsinki with the Helsinki Philharmonic Society conducted by Robert Kajanus.

1901–present
1921 – World War I: U.S. President Warren G. Harding signs the Knox–Porter Resolution formally ending the war between the United States and Germany. 
1934 – The Night of the Long Knives ends with the death of Ernst Röhm.
1937 – Amelia Earhart and navigator Fred Noonan are last heard from over the Pacific Ocean while attempting to make the first equatorial round-the-world flight.
1940 – Indian independence leader Subhas Chandra Bose is arrested and detained in Calcutta.
  1940   – The SS Arandora Star is sunk by U-47 in the North Atlantic with the loss of over 800 lives, mostly civilians. 
1962 – The first Walmart store, then known as Wal-Mart, opens for business in Rogers, Arkansas.
1964 – Civil rights movement: U.S. President Lyndon B. Johnson signs the Civil Rights Act of 1964 meant to prohibit segregation in public places.
1966 – France conducts its first nuclear weapon test in the Pacific, on Moruroa Atoll.
1976 – End of South Vietnam; Communist North Vietnam annexes the former South Vietnam to form the unified Socialist Republic of Vietnam.
1986 – Rodrigo Rojas and Carmen Gloria Quintana are burnt alive during a street demonstration against the dictatorship of General Augusto Pinochet in Chile.
  1986   – Aeroflot Flight 2306 crashes while attempting an emergency landing at Syktyvkar Airport in Syktyvkar, in present-day Komi Republic, Russia, killing 54 people.
1988 – Marcel Lefebvre and the four bishops he consecrated were excommunicated by the Holy See.
1990 – In the 1990 Mecca tunnel tragedy, 1,400 Muslim pilgrims are suffocated to death and trampled upon in a pedestrian tunnel leading to the holy city of Mecca.
1994 – USAir Flight 1016 crashes near Charlotte Douglas International Airport, killing 37 of the 57 people on board.
1997 – The Bank of Thailand floats the baht, triggering the Asian financial crisis.
2000 – Vicente Fox Quesada is elected the first President of México from an opposition party, the Partido Acción Nacional, after more than 70 years of continuous rule by the Partido Revolucionario Institucional.
2001 – The AbioCor self-contained artificial heart is first implanted.
2002 – Steve Fossett becomes the first person to fly solo around the world nonstop in a balloon.
2005 – The Live 8 benefit concerts takes place in the G8 states and in South Africa. More than 1,000 musicians perform and are broadcast on 182 television networks and 2,000 radio networks.
2008 – Colombian conflict: Íngrid Betancourt, a member of the Chamber of Representatives of Colombia, is released from captivity after being held for six and a half years by FARC.
2010 – The South Kivu tank truck explosion in the Democratic Republic of the Congo kills at least 230 people.
2013 – The International Astronomical Union names Pluto's fourth and fifth moons, Kerberos and Styx.
  2013   – A magnitude 6.1 earthquake strikes Aceh, Indonesia, killing at least 42 people and injuring 420 others.

Births

Pre-1600
 419 – Valentinian III, Roman emperor (d. 455)
1363 – Maria, Queen of Sicily (d. 1401)
1478 – Louis V, Elector Palatine (d. 1544)
1486 – Jacopo Sansovino, Italian sculptor and architect (d. 1570)
1489 – Thomas Cranmer, English archbishop, theologian, and saint (d. 1556)
1492 – Elizabeth Tudor, English daughter of Henry VII of England (d. 1495)
1500 – Federico Cesi (cardinal), Italian cardinal (d. 1565)
1575 – Elizabeth de Vere, Countess of Derby, English noblewoman and head of state of the Isle of Man (d. 1627)
1597 – Theodoor Rombouts, Flemish painter (d. 1637)

1601–1900
1647 – Daniel Finch, 2nd Earl of Nottingham, English politician, Lord President of the Council (d. 1730)
1648 – Arp Schnitger, German organ builder (d. 1719)
1665 – Samuel Penhallow, English-American soldier and historian (d. 1726)
1667 – Pietro Ottoboni, Italian cardinal and art collector (d. 1740)
1714 – Christoph Willibald Gluck, German composer (d. 1787)
1724 – Friedrich Gottlieb Klopstock, German poet and author (d. 1803)
1797 – Francisco Javier Echeverría, Mexican businessman and politician. President of Mexico (1841) (d. 1852) 
1819 – Charles-Louis Hanon, French pianist and composer (d. 1900)
1820 – George Law Curry, American publisher and politician, 5th Governor of the Oregon Territory (d. 1878)
  1820   – Juan N. Méndez, Mexican general and interim president, 1876-1877 (d. 1894)
1821 – Charles Tupper, Canadian physician and politician, 6th Prime Minister of Canada (d. 1915)
1825 – Émile Ollivier, French statesman (d. 1913)
1834 – Hendrick Peter Godfried Quack, Dutch economist and historian (d. 1917)
1849 – Maria Theresa of Austria-Este (d. 1919)
1862 – William Henry Bragg, English physicist, chemist, and mathematician, Nobel Prize laureate (d. 1942)
1865 – Lily Braun, German author and publicist (d. 1916)
1869 – Liane de Pougy, French-Swiss dancer and author (d. 1950)
1876 – Harriet Brooks, Canadian physicist and academic (d. 1933)
  1876   – Wilhelm Cuno, German businessman and politician, Chancellor of Germany (d. 1933)
1877 – Hermann Hesse, German-born Swiss poet, novelist, and painter, Nobel Prize laureate (d. 1962)
  1877   – Rinaldo Cuneo, American artist ("the painter of San Francisco") (d. 1939)
1881 – Royal Hurlburt Weller, American lawyer and politician (d. 1929)
1884 – Alfons Maria Jakob, German neurologist and author (d. 1931)
1893 – Ralph Hancock, Welsh gardener and author (d. 1950)
1900 – Tyrone Guthrie, English actor and director (d. 1971)
  1900   – Sophie Harris, English costume and scenic designer for theatre and opera (d. 1966)

1901–present
1902 – K. Kanapathypillai, Sri Lankan author and academic (d. 1968)
1903 – Alec Douglas-Home, English cricketer and politician, 66th Prime Minister of the United Kingdom (d. 1995)
  1903   – Olav V of Norway (d. 1991)
1904 – René Lacoste, French tennis player and businessman, created the polo shirt (d. 1996)
1906 – Hans Bethe, German-American physicist and academic, Nobel Prize laureate (d. 2005)
  1906   – Károly Kárpáti, Hungarian Jewish wrestler (d. 1996)
  1906   – Séra Martin, French middle-distance runner (d. 1993)
1908 – Thurgood Marshall, American lawyer and civil rights activist, 32nd Solicitor General of the United States, and former Associate Justice of the Supreme Court of the United States (d. 1993)
1911 – Reg Parnell, English race car driver and manager (d. 1964)
1913 – Max Beloff, Baron Beloff, English historian and academic (d. 1999)
1914 – Frederick Fennell, American conductor and educator (d. 2004)
  1914   – Ethelreda Leopold, American actress (d. 1988)
  1914   – Mário Schenberg, Brazilian physicist and engineer (d. 1990)
  1914   – Erich Topp, German admiral (d. 2005)
1915 – Valerian Wellesley, 8th Duke of Wellington, British peer, politician and soldier (d. 2014)
1916 – Ken Curtis, American actor and singer (d. 1991)
  1916   – Hans-Ulrich Rudel, German colonel and pilot (d. 1982)
  1916   – Reino Kangasmäki, Finnish wrestler (d. 2010)
  1916   – Zélia Gattai, Brazilian author and photographer (d. 2008)
1917 – Leonard J. Arrington, American author and academic, founded the Mormon History Association (d. 1999)
1918 – Athos Bulcão, Brazilian painter and sculptor (d. 2008)
  1918   – Indumati Bhattacharya, Indian politician (d. 1990)
1919 – Jean Craighead George, American author (d. 2012)
1920 – John Kneubuhl, Samoan-American historian, screenwriter, and playwright (d. 1992)
1922 – Pierre Cardin, Italian-French fashion designer (d. 2020)
  1922   – Paula Valenska, Czech actress (d. 1994)
1923 – Cyril M. Kornbluth, American soldier and author (d. 1958)
  1923   – Wisława Szymborska, Polish poet and translator, Nobel Prize laureate (d. 2012)
1925 – Medgar Evers, American soldier and activist (d. 1963)
  1925   – Patrice Lumumba, Congolese politician, 1st Prime Minister of the Democratic Republic of the Congo (d. 1961)
  1925   – Marvin Rainwater, American singer-songwriter (d. 2013)
1926 – Octavian Paler, Romanian journalist and politician (d. 2007)
1927 – Lee Allen, American saxophone player (d. 1994)
  1927   – James Mackay, Baron Mackay of Clashfern, Scottish lawyer and politician, Lord High Chancellor of Great Britain
  1927   – Brock Peters, American actor (d. 2005)
1929 – Imelda Marcos, Filipino politician; 10th First Lady of the Philippines
1930 – Carlos Menem, Argentinian lawyer and politician, 50th President of Argentina (d. 2021)
1931 – Mohammad Yazdi, Iranian cleric (d. 2020)
1932 – Dave Thomas, American businessman and philanthropist, founded Wendy's (d. 2002)
1933 – Peter Desbarats, Canadian journalist, author, and playwright (d. 2014)
  1933   – Kenny Wharram, Canadian ice hockey player (d. 2017)
1934 – Tom Springfield, English musician
1935 – Gilbert Kalish, American pianist and educator
1936 – Omar Suleiman, Egyptian general and politician, 16th Vice President of Egypt (d. 2012)
1937 – Polly Holliday, American actress
  1937   – Richard Petty, American race car driver and sportscaster
1938 – David Owen, English physician and politician, Secretary of State for Foreign and Commonwealth Affairs
1939 – Alexandros Panagoulis, Greek poet and politician (d. 1976)
  1939   – John H. Sununu, American engineer and politician, 14th White House Chief of Staff
  1939   – Paul Williams, American singer and choreographer (d. 1973)
1940 – Kenneth Clarke, English politician, Lord High Chancellor of Great Britain
  1940   – Georgi Ivanov, Bulgarian military officer, cosmonaut and politician
1941 – William Guest, American singer-songwriter and producer (d. 2015) 
  1941   – Wendell Mottley, Trinidadian sprinter, economist, and politician
1942 – John Eekelaar, South African-English lawyer and scholar
  1942   – Vicente Fox, Mexican businessman and politician, 35th President of Mexico
1943 – Ivi Eenmaa, Estonian politician, 36th Mayor of Tallinn
  1943   – Larry Lake, American-Canadian trumpet player and composer (d. 2013)
1946 – Richard Axel, American neuroscientist and biologist, Nobel Prize laureate
  1946   – Ron Silver, American actor, director, and political activist (d. 2009)
1947 – Larry David, American actor, comedian, producer, and screenwriter
  1947   – Ann Taylor, Baroness Taylor of Bolton, English politician, Minister for International Security Strategy
1948 – Mutula Kilonzo, Kenyan lawyer and politician (d. 2013)
1949 – Greg Brown, American musician
  1949   – Robert Paquette, Canadian singer-songwriter and guitarist
1950 – Lynne Brindley, English librarian and academic
  1950   – Jon Trickett, English politician
1952 – Sylvia Rivera, American transgender rights activist (d. 2002) 
  1952   – Anatoliy Solomin, Ukrainian race walker and coach
1954 – Chris Huhne, English journalist and politician, Secretary of State for Energy and Climate Change
1955 – Kim Carr, Australian educator and politician, 31st Australian Minister for Human Services
1956 – Jerry Hall, American model and actress
1957 – Bret Hart, Canadian wrestler
  1957   – Jüri Raidla, Estonian lawyer and politician, Estonian Minister of Justice
  1957   – Purvis Short, American basketball player
1958 – Pavan Malhotra, Indian actor
1960 – Maria Lourdes Sereno, Filipino lawyer and jurist, 24th Chief Justice of the Supreme Court of the Philippines
1961 – Clark Kellogg, American basketball player and sportscaster
1962 – Neil Williams, English cricketer (d. 2006)
1964 – Jose Canseco, Cuban-American baseball player and mixed martial artist
  1964   – Ozzie Canseco, Cuban-American baseball player, coach, and manager
  1964   – Joe Magrane, American baseball player and sportscaster
  1964   – Alan Tait, English-Scottish rugby player and coach
1965 – Norbert Röttgen, German lawyer and politician
1969 – Tim Rodber, English rugby player
1970 – Derrick Adkins, American hurdler
  1970   – Steve Morrow, Northern Irish footballer and manager
1971 – Troy Brown, American football player and actor
  1971   – Bryan Redpath, Scottish rugby player and coach
1972 – Darren Shan, Irish author
1974 – Sean Casey, American baseball player and sportscaster
1975 – Éric Dazé, Canadian ice hockey player
  1975   – Kristen Michal, Estonian lawyer and politician
  1975   – Erik Ohlsson, Swedish singer and guitarist 
  1975   – Stefan Terblanche, South African rugby player
1976 – Krisztián Lisztes, Hungarian footballer
  1976   – Tomáš Vokoun, Czech-American ice hockey player
1977 – Deniz Barış, Turkish footballer
1978 – Jüri Ratas, Estonian politician, 42nd Mayor of Tallinn
1979 – Walter Davis, American triple jumper
  1979   – Ahmed al-Ghamdi, Saudi Arabian terrorist, hijacker of United Airlines Flight 175 (d. 2001)
  1979   – Sam Hornish Jr., American race car driver
  1979   – Joe Thornton, Canadian ice hockey player
1980 – Nyjer Morgan, American baseball player
1981 – Nathan Ellington, English footballer 
  1981   – Carlos Rogers, American football player
1983 – Michelle Branch, American singer-songwriter and guitarist
  1983   – Kyle Hogg, English cricketer
1984 – Thomas Kortegaard, Danish footballer
  1984   – Johnny Weir, American figure skater
1985 – Rhett Bomar, American football player
  1985   – Chad Henne, American football player
  1985   – Ashley Tisdale, American actress, singer, and producer
1986 – Brett Cecil, American baseball player
  1986   – Lindsay Lohan, American actress and singer
1987 – Esteban Granero, Spanish footballer
1988 – Lee Chung-yong, South Korean footballer
1989 – Nadezhda Grishaeva, Russian basketball player
  1989   – Alex Morgan, American soccer player
1990 – Kayla Harrison, American judoka
  1990   – Merritt Mathias, American soccer player
  1990   – Morag McLellan, Scottish field hockey player
  1990   – Margot Robbie, Australian actress and producer
  1990   – Danny Rose, English footballer
  1990   – Bill Tupou, New Zealand rugby league player
1992 – Madison Chock, American ice dancer 
1993 – Vince Staples, American rapper and actor
  1993   – Diamonté Harper, American rapper
1994 – Henrik Kristoffersen, Norwegian skier
1995 – Ryan Murphy, American swimmer
1996 – Julia Grabher, Austrian tennis player

Deaths

Pre-1600
 626 – Li Jiancheng, Chinese prince (b. 589)
   626   – Li Yuanji, Chinese prince (b. 603)
 649 – Li Jing, Chinese general (b. 571)
 862 – Swithun, English bishop and saint (b. 789)
 866 – Robert the Strong, Frankish nobleman
 936 – Henry the Fowler, German king (b. 876)
1215 – Eisai, Japanese Buddhist priest (b. 1141)
1298 – Adolf, King of the Romans (b. 1220)
1504 – Stephen III of Moldavia (b. 1434)
1566 – Nostradamus, French astrologer and author (b. 1503)
1578 – Thomas Doughty, English explorer 
1582 – Akechi Mitsuhide, Japanese samurai and warlord (b. 1528)
1591 – Vincenzo Galilei, Italian lute player and composer (b. 1520)

1601–1900
1619 – Francis II, Duke of Saxe-Lauenburg (b. 1547)
1621 – Thomas Harriot, English astronomer, mathematician, and ethnographer (b. 1560)
1656 – François-Marie, comte de Broglie, Italian-French general (b. 1611)
1674 – Eberhard III, Duke of Württemberg (b. 1614)
1743 – Spencer Compton, 1st Earl of Wilmington, English politician, Prime Minister of the United Kingdom (b. 1673)
1746 – Thomas Baker, English antiquarian and author (b. 1656)
1778 – Jean-Jacques Rousseau, Swiss philosopher and composer (b. 1712)
1833 – Gervasio Antonio de Posadas, Argentinian lawyer and politician, 1st Supreme Director of the United Provinces of the Río de la Plata (b. 1757)
1843 – Samuel Hahnemann, German physician and academic (b. 1755)
1850 – Robert Peel, English lieutenant and politician, Prime Minister of the United Kingdom (b. 1788)
1857 – Carlo Pisacane, Italian soldier and philosopher (b. 1818)

1901–present
1903 – Ed Delahanty, American baseball player (b. 1867)
1912 – Tom Richardson, English cricketer (b. 1870)
1914 – Joseph Chamberlain, English businessman and politician, Secretary of State for the Colonies (b. 1836)
1915 – Porfirio Díaz, Mexican general and politician, 29th President of Mexico (b. 1830)
1920 – William Louis Marshall, American general and engineer (b. 1846)
1926 – Émile Coué, French psychologist and pharmacist (b. 1857)
1929 – Gladys Brockwell, American actress (b. 1894)
1932 – Manuel II of Portugal (b. 1889)
1950 – Thomas William Burgess, English swimmer and water polo player (b. 1872)
1955 – Edward Lawson, English soldier, Victoria Cross recipient (b. 1873)
1961 – Ernest Hemingway, American novelist, short story writer, and journalist, Nobel Prize laureate (b. 1899)
1963 – Alicia Patterson, American publisher, co-founded Newsday (b. 1906)
1964 – Fireball Roberts, American race car driver (b. 1929)
1966 – Jan Brzechwa, Polish poet and author (b. 1900)
1970 – Jessie Street, Australian suffragette and feminist (b. 1889)
1972 – Joseph Fielding Smith, American religious leader, 10th President of The Church of Jesus Christ of Latter-day Saints (b. 1876)
1973 – Betty Grable, American actress, singer, and dancer (b. 1916)
  1973   – George McBride, American baseball player and manager (b. 1880)
  1973   – Ferdinand Schörner, German field marshal (b. 1892)
1975 – James Robertson Justice, English actor (b. 1907)
1977 – Vladimir Nabokov, Russian-born novelist and critic (b. 1899)
1978 – Aris Alexandrou, Greek author and poet (b. 1922)
1986 – Peanuts Lowrey, American baseball player and manager (b. 1917)
1988 – Vibert Douglas, Canadian astronomer and astrophysicist (b. 1894)
1989 – Andrei Gromyko, Soviet economist and politician, Soviet Minister of Foreign Affairs (b. 1909)
1990 – Snooky Lanson, American singer (b. 1914)
1991 – Lee Remick, American actress (b. 1935)
1993 – Fred Gwynne, American actor (b. 1926)
1994 – Andrés Escobar, Colombian footballer (b. 1967)
1995 – Lloyd MacPhail, Canadian businessman and politician, 23rd Lieutenant Governor of Prince Edward Island (b. 1920)
1997 – James Stewart, American actor (b. 1908)
1999 – Mario Puzo, American author and screenwriter (b. 1920)
2000 – Joey Dunlop, Northern Irish motorcycle racer (b. 1952)
2002 – Ray Brown, American bassist and composer (b. 1926)
2003 – Briggs Cunningham, American race car driver and businessman (b. 1907)
2004 – Mochtar Lubis, Indonesian journalist and author (b. 1922)
2005 – Ernest Lehman, American director, producer, and screenwriter (b. 1915)
  2005   – Norm Prescott, American actor, composer, and producer, co-founded Filmation Studios (b. 1927)
2006 – Jan Murray, American comedian, actor, and game show host (b. 1916)
2007 – Beverly Sills, American operatic soprano and television personality (b. 1929)
2008 – Natasha Shneider, Russian-American singer, keyboard player, and actress (b. 1956)
  2008   – Elizabeth Spriggs, English actress and screenwriter (b. 1929)
2010 – Beryl Bainbridge, English screenwriter and author (b. 1932)
2011 – Itamar Franco, Brazilian engineer and politician, 33rd President of Brazil (b. 1930)
2012 – Maurice Chevit, French actor and screenwriter (b. 1923)
  2012   – Julian Goodman, American journalist (b. 1922)
  2012   – Angelo Mangiarotti, Italian architect and academic (b. 1921)
  2012   – Betty Meggers, American archaeologist and academic (b. 1921)
  2012   – Ed Stroud, American baseball player (b. 1939)
2013 – Anthony G. Bosco, American bishop (b. 1927)
  2013   – Douglas Engelbart, American computer scientist, invented the computer mouse (b. 1925)
  2013   – Armand Gaudreault, Canadian ice hockey player (b. 1921)
  2013   – Anthony Llewellyn, Welsh-American chemist, academic, and astronaut (b. 1933)
2014 – Emilio Álvarez Montalván, Nicaraguan ophthalmologist and politician (b. 1919)
  2014   – Manuel Cardona, Spanish physicist and academic (b. 1934)
  2014   – Mary Innes-Ker, Duchess of Roxburghe (b. 1915)
  2014   – Harold W. Kuhn, American mathematician and academic (b. 1925)
  2014   – Louis Zamperini, American runner and World War II US Army Air Forces captain (b. 1917)
2015 – Ronald Davison, New Zealand lawyer and judge, 10th Chief Justice of New Zealand (b. 1920) 
  2015   – Charlie Sanders, American football player and sportscaster (b. 1946)
  2015   – Jim Weaver, American football player and coach (b. 1945)
  2015   – Jacobo Zabludovsky, Mexican journalist (b. 1928)
2016 – Caroline Aherne, English actress and comedian (b. 1963)
  2016   – Michael Cimino, American director, producer, and screenwriter (b. 1939)
  2016   – Patrick Manning, 4th & 6th Prime Minister of Trinidad and Tobago (b. 1946)
  2016   – Elie Wiesel, Holocaust survivor, activist, and author (b. 1928)
2017 – Vladislav Rastorotsky, a Russian (and former Soviet) artistic gymnastics coach, (b. 1933)
  2017   – Smith Hart, American-born Canadian professional wrestler (b. 1948)
2018 – Alan Longmuir,  Scottish musician (b. 1948)
2019 – Lee Iacocca, American automotive executive (b.1924)
2020 – Ángela Jeria, Chilean archaeologist (b. 1926)
  2020   – Byron Bernstein, American Twitch streamer (b. 1989)

Holidays and observances
Christian feast day:
Aberoh and Atom (Coptic Church)
Bernardino Realino
Feast of the Visitation (Anglicanism; Levoča at Mariánska hora)
Monegundis
Otto of Bamberg
Oudoceus
Martinian and Processus
Pishoy (Coptic Church)
Stephen III of Moldavia
July 2 (Eastern Orthodox liturgics)
Flag Day (Curaçao) 
Palio di Provenzano (Siena, Italy)
Police Day (Azerbaijan)

References

External links

 
 
 

Days of the year
July